Siobhan Williams is a British-born Canadian actress.

Career 
Williams' first role was as recurring character Jamie Lewis on Heartland. In 2012, she appeared in Disney's Radio Rebel and played the antagonist, Stephanie Meyers, in 20th Century Fox's Flicka: Country Pride, for which she was nominated for a Young Artist Award (Best Performance by a Young Actress 2013). She was also nominated for her performance in Nasser Group's Christmas Miracle (Best Supporting Actress). Williams also played the recurring character Ginger on the Cartoon Network's live-action series Level Up, which was picked up in Canada by Teletoon. Williams guest-starred in the second episode of CTV's new procedural drama Motive, which aired as the series premiere on American Network ABC after it was picked up in summer 2013. Williams played Tiffany Greenwood, a high school student brutally murdered by a mayoral candidate/family friend she threatened to expose.  This performance merited her yet another Young Artist Award nomination, and this time she won for Best Performance by a Guest Star. She also appeared in a supporting role in Lifetime's Forever 16, which was released in September 2013.

Williams guest starred in the Season 3 Premiere and Finale of AMC's Hell On Wheels. She played the daughter of a Mormon patriarch whose family is evicted from their homestead by railway officials and appeared in a highly controversial arc with series lead Anson Mount.  She was due to return in season 4 as series regular but was unable to accept the contract due to scheduling conflicts with Black Box. In the summer of 2013 she filmed a western directed by Jon Cassar entitled Forsaken, alongside Kiefer Sutherland, Donald Sutherland, Demi Moore and Brian Cox. On August 8, 2014, it was announced that Williams was cast in the Lifetime dramedy series UnREAL.

Filmography

Awards and nominations

References

External links 
 
 
 Official Twitter

Canadian television actresses
Living people
Canadian film actresses
Year of birth uncertain
People from Cambridge
21st-century Canadian actresses
1992 births